Ladys Walk are a Gaelic Athletic Association hurling club in Ballyduff in North County Kerry, Ireland. They are the Ballyduff second team. They play in the County Intermediate Hurling Championship.

Roll of honour

County Intermediate Hurling Championship
 Kerry Intermediate Hurling Championship: (2)
 2002, 2008
 Runners-Up 1998, 1999, 2000, 2007

Gaelic games clubs in County Kerry
Hurling clubs in County Kerry

See: North Kerry - a hurling history [written by Tommy O'Connor, published by the North Kerry Hurling Board, 2015;  ]